The Sibelius Hall is a concert hall in Lahti, Finland, named after the composer Jean Sibelius. The concert hall was completed in 2000. Architects Kimmo Lintula and Hannu Tikka designed the hall, which is made out of glulam. The acoustics were engineered by Artec Consultants, New York. Its acoustics are one of its strongest points, while the architecture follows the Scandinavian tradition of sophisticated design. The concert hall has a capacity of 1,250 seats.

The Sibelius Hall is home to the Lahti Symphony Orchestra.

References
BIS Liner notes

External links

 LSO Sibelius Hall page
 Sibelius Hall at Lahti Guide

Kartano
Concert halls in Finland
Buildings and structures in Päijät-Häme
Tourist attractions in Päijät-Häme
Things named after Jean Sibelius